Mary Travis Bassett is an American physician and public health researcher who was the 17th Health Commissioner of the New York State Department of Health, being appointed to the position by Governor Kathy Hochul on September 29, 2021 until December 31, 2022. From 2014 to 2018, she was the commissioner of the New York City Department of Health and Mental Hygiene. Bassett is the Director of the FXB Center for Health and Human Rights at Harvard University and the FXB Professor of the Practice of Health and Human Rights at the Harvard School of Public Health.  She is also an associate professor of clinical epidemiology at the Columbia University Mailman School of Public Health.

Early life and education
Bassett received her B.A. in history and science from Harvard University in 1974, her M.D. from the Columbia University College of Physicians and Surgeons in 1979, and her MPH in Health Services (Health Policy Research) from the University of Washington in 1985. She completed her medical residency at Harlem Hospital Center.

Career
Bassett lived in Zimbabwe from 1985 to 2002, during which time she served on the medical faculty of the University of Zimbabwe. She was appointed deputy commissioner of Health Promotion and Disease Prevention at the New York City Department of Health and Mental Hygiene in 2002. Beginning in 2009, she served as the program director for the Doris Duke Charitable Foundation's African Health Initiative.

In January 2014, she was appointed by New York City mayor Bill de Blasio to serve as New York City Health Commissioner. Since being appointed to this position, which was the largest she had ever held, she helped lead the city's response to the Ebola virus cases in the United States that were first reported in the fall of 2014. She also addressed New Yorkers regarding outbreaks of Legionnaire's disease in their city. In February 2015, she wrote a perspective piece in the New England Journal of Medicine regarding the adverse health effects of racial discrimination against African Americans.

In November 2015, Bassett gave a TEDMED talk, "Why your doctor should care about social justice." In this talk, Bassett spoke about witnessing the AIDS epidemic firsthand in Zimbabwe and setting up a clinic to treat and educate people about the virus. However, Bassett said she regrets not speaking out against structural inequities during her time in Zimbabwe. Bassett said these same structural problems exist in the United States today, and as New York City's Health Commissioner, she would use every chance she had to rally support for health equity and speak out against racism.

In October 2016, Bassett was awarded the Frank A. Calderone Prize by the Mailman School of Public Health. This prize was established in 1986, and is the most prestigious honor in the field of public health in the United States.

In 2017, Bassett was elected to become a member of the National Academy of Medicine.

She was succeeded as New York City Health Commissioner by Oxiris Barbot in 2018.

Select publications

References

External links
Biography on New York City Department of Health and Mental Hygiene website

Living people
American public health doctors
Physicians from New York City
Harvard University alumni
Columbia University Vagelos College of Physicians and Surgeons alumni
University of Washington School of Public Health alumni
Columbia University Mailman School of Public Health faculty
Commissioners of Health of the City of New York
American women epidemiologists
American epidemiologists
African-American physicians
African-American women academics
American women academics
African-American academics
Harvard School of Public Health faculty
21st-century African-American people
21st-century African-American women
Members of the National Academy of Medicine
1952 births
Women public health doctors